Woh Mera Dil Tha is a 2018 Pakistani television family drama series aired on ARY Digital. It is produced by Wajahat Rauf and Shazia Wajahat under their production banner Showcase Productions. It stars Sami Khan, Madiha Imam and Furqan Qureshi in lead roles.

Cast
Madiha Imam as Naina: a simple and beautiful girl who fall in love with her cousin, Arham.
Sami Khan as Zaid:Naina and Arham's mutual friend trying to help them out against their families but Instead gets entangled more deeply.
Furqan Qureshi as Arham: Naina's cousin and love interest. Rather than taking a strong against his parents, he leaves Naina behind at the mercy of her fate.
Behroze Sabzwari as Fayyaz: Naina's father 
Shaheen Khan as Raheela: Naina's mother
Nida Mumtaz as Suraiyya: Zaid, Khadijah, Haris and Shabana's mother
Tariq Jameel as Hameed: Zaid, Khadijah, Haris and Shabana's father
Sohail Hashmi as Nawaz: Arham's father, Raheela's brother and Fayyaz's business rival 
Birjees Farooqi: Arham's mother, Nawaz's wife
Wardah Aziz as Sonia: Zaid's ex-girlfriend.
Sonia Rao as Khadijah: Zaid, Haris and Shabana's elder sister.
Zohreh Aamir as Shabana: Younger sister of Zaid, Khadijah and Haris.
Mahi Baloch as Saba: sister-in-lawof Khadijah, wants to marry Zaid.
Haris Khan as Haris: Zaid, Khadijah and Shabana's brother.
Akhiyar Khan as Qaiser: Khadijah's husband, Saba's brother.
Sidrah Rose as Seema: Zaid's university friend. (Cameo)

References

External links
 

2018 Pakistani television series debuts
2018 Pakistani television series endings
ARY Digital original programming